Creamer's Field Migratory Waterfowl Refuge is a 2,200 acre (7.3 km2) bird sanctuary, located within the Fairbanks North Star Borough in the U.S. state of Alaska and partially within the city limits of Fairbanks. It consists of wetlands, fields, and forests. The refuge surrounds the former farm of Charles Hinckley and later Charles Albert Creamer (1889-1974), a former chicken rancher from Washington state who moved to Fairbanks. Creamer saved waste grains from his barn to feed migrating birds. After Creamer's death, preservationists banded together to make the area a state refuge. The Creamer farmstead now serves as a visitor center and environmental education center, with the non-profit "Friends of Creamer's Field" presenting programs year-round. In the summer visitors can take a guided nature walk on the refuge trails. The refuge is open 24 hours a day 7 days a week. It is a multi-use refuge, and limited hunting is also allowed in certain seasons. In winter dog mushing trails criss cross the back of the acreage, while skijorers have trails in the front fields.

Among the birds that flock to the refuge in spring and fall during migrations are Sandhill Cranes, Loons, Swans, Canada geese, Plovers, and Sandpipers. In total, over 100 bird species have been spotted in the refuge.

History 
Charles Hinckley built a log barn and opened a dairy business upon arriving in Fairbanks in 1904. In 1938 Charles Albert Creamer succeeded to Hinckley and built the modern day barn, which is still visible today. All other buildings in the area were constructed subsequently after, up to the closure of business in 1965. The State of Alaska purchased all the land around the dairy in 1969, to establish the Migratory Refuge. The property is the only group of pioneer dairy farm buildings surviving in the interior of Alaska.

The Creamer's Dairy, also known as Hinckley's Dairy, comprising the barn and five other historical buildings, was listed on the National Register of Historic Places in 1977.

See also

National Register of Historic Places listings in Fairbanks North Star Borough, Alaska

References

External links
Alaska Department of Fish and Game - Creamer's Field Migratory Waterfowl Refuge
Friends of Creamer's Field

Bird sanctuaries of the United States
Dairy farming in the United States
Nature reserves in Alaska
Protected areas of Fairbanks North Star Borough, Alaska
Buildings and structures in Fairbanks, Alaska
Buildings and structures on the National Register of Historic Places in Fairbanks North Star Borough, Alaska
National Register of Historic Places in Fairbanks North Star Borough, Alaska
Protected areas established in 1969
1969 establishments in Alaska